The UWA World Light Heavyweight Championship (Campeonato Mundial Semi Completo de UWA in Spanish) is a singles professional wrestling championship initially promoted by the Mexican Lucha Libre wrestling based promotion Universal Wrestling Association (UWA) from 1975 until the UWA closed in 1995 and since then been defended on the Mexican independent circuit until 2007. By the year 2000 the title became a mainstay in Asistencia Asesoría y Administración (AAA) when it was won by El Zorro who worked for AAA.

Chessman was the last UWA Light Heavyweight champion recognized by Asistencia Asesoría y Administración  having defeated El Zorro in April, 2007. in 2007 Chessman competed in the tournament to crown the first ever AAA Mega Champion and put his title on the line in the tournament. In the finals he lost to El Mesias by disqualification, while the title does not change hands on a disqualification the UWA World Light Heavyweight Championship was eliminated as the purpose of the tournament was to find one top champion and clear up the muddled championship picture in AAA.

As a professional wrestling championship, the championship is not won not by actual competition, but by a scripted ending to a match determined by the bookers and match makers. On occasion the promotion declares a championship vacant, which means there is no champion at that point in time. This can either be due to a storyline, or real life issues such as a champion suffering an injury being unable to defend the championship, or leaving the company.

There have been a total of 41 reigns shared between 25 different champions. The current title holder is Black Eagle, who is in his first reign.

Title history

Combined reigns 

{| class="wikitable sortable" style="text-align: center"
!Rank
!Wrestler
!No. ofreigns
!Combineddays
|-
!1
| Fishman || 4 || 2,001
|-
!2
| Zandokan || 1 || 1,171
|-
!3
| El Solitario || 1 || 584
|-
!4
| Gran Hamada || 2 || 514
|-
!5
| Heavy Metal || 1 || 418
|-
!6
|  || 5 || 412
|-
!7
| Charly Manson || 1 || 395
|-
!8
| Ray Mendoza || 3 || 371
|-
!9
| El Texano || 1 || 364
|-
!10
|style="background-color:#FFE6BD"| Black Eagle † || 1 || +
|-
!11
| Villano III || 2 || 308
|-
!12
| Adrian el Exstico || 1 || 299
|-
!13
| El Signo || 2 || 253
|-
!14
| Villano V || 2 || style="background-color:#bbeeff"| ¤212
|-
!15
| Perro Aguayo || 1 || 201
|-
!16
| Villano I || 1 || 160
|-
!17
| Audaz || 1 || 154
|-
!18
| Sangre Chicana || 2 ||style="background-color:#bbeeff"| ¤107
|-
!19
| Mr. Águila || 2 || 106
|-
!20
| Silver King || 1 || 62
|-
!21
| Chessman || 1 || 29
|-
!rowspan=4|22
| El Cobarde || 1 || style="background-color:#bbeeff"| ¤N/A
|-
| Electroshock || 1 || style="background-color:#bbeeff"| ¤N/A
|-
| Hator || 1 || style="background-color:#bbeeff"| ¤N/A
|-
| Prince Maya || 1 || style="background-color:#bbeeff"| ¤N/A

Footnotes

References

Universal Wrestling Association championships
Light heavyweight wrestling championships
Lucha Libre AAA Worldwide championships
World professional wrestling championships